"Right from the Start" is a song written by Billy Herzig and Randy Watkins, and recorded by American country music artist Earl Thomas Conley.  It was released in July 1987 as the fourth single from the album Too Many Times.  The song was Conley's fourteenth number one country single.  The single went to number one for one week and spent a total of fourteen weeks on the country chart.

Charts

Weekly charts

Year-end charts

References

1987 singles
1986 songs
Earl Thomas Conley songs
RCA Records singles
Song recordings produced by Mark Wright (record producer)